Kirkoswald is a village and parish in the Carrick district of Ayrshire, Scotland,  from the coast and  southwest of Maybole. It takes its name from its kirk (church), dedicated to Oswald of Northumbria, who is said to have won a battle here in the 7th century. The old church, which was built in 1244 and houses the baptismal font of Robert the Bruce, is now a ruin in the grounds of the modern church, which was built in 1777 to a design by Robert Adam. Kirkoswald is also noted for its connection with Robert Burns, whose maternal ancestors, the Brouns, were from the village. Burns also attended school here, and would later base the characters Tam o' Shanter, Kirkton Jean and souter Johnnie on village locals Douglas Graham, Jean Aird and John Davidson, the shoemaker.

Kirkoswald village had a population of 194 in 1991. Landmarks include Turnberry Castle, the ancient seat of the Earls of Carrick, Culzean Castle, Thomaston Castle and Crossraguel Abbey.

Rev Robert Hunter Arbuckle was minister of the Free Church from 1860 and 1897.

Gallery

References

External links
The Gazetteer for Scotland - Kirkoswald
Kirkoswald Parish Profile

Villages in Carrick, Scotland